The 2017 Bowling Green Falcons football team represented Bowling Green State University in the 2017 NCAA Division I FBS football season. The Falcons were led by second-year head coach Mike Jinks and played their home games at Doyt Perry Stadium in Bowling Green, Ohio as members of the East Division of the Mid-American Conference. They finished the season 2–10, 2–6 in MAC play to finish in fifth place in the East Division.

Previous season 
The Falcons finished the 2016 season 4–8, 3–5 in MAC play to finish in a tie for third place in the East Division.

Preseason 
In a preseason poll of league media, Bowling Green was picked to finish in third place in the East Division.

Coaching staff

Source:

Schedule

Game summaries

at Michigan State

South Dakota

at Northwestern

at Middle Tennessee

Akron

at Miami (OH)

Ohio

Northern Illinois

at Kent State

at Buffalo

Toledo

at Eastern Michigan

References

Bowling Green
Bowling Green Falcons football seasons
Bowling Green Falcons football